RMS Majestic was a steamship built in 1890 and operated by the White Star Line.

History
Constructed by Harland and Wolff, Majestic was launched  on 29 June 1889 and was delivered to White Star in March 1890. White Star had sought to fund the construction of both Majestic and  through the British government, a proposal which was accepted with the stipulation that the Royal Navy would have access to the two liners in a time of war. Majestic and her sister were the first new additions to White Star's transatlantic fleet since the Britannic and Germanic had respectively entered service in 1874 and 1875. Together, the two new ships replaced the aging Baltic and Republic, which had both been in service with White Star since 1872 and were subsequently sold to new owners prior to the new ships entering service.

On 2 April 1890, Majestic left Liverpool on her maiden voyage to New York City. Majestic failed, but eventually achieved the goal on a westbound voyage between 30 July and 5 August 1891, with an average speed of 20.1 knots. Unfortunately, Majestic held the honour for a mere two weeks, as Teutonic completed a crossing on 19 August with a speed of 20.35 knots. City of Paris regained the Blue Riband a year later.

In 1895, Majestic was assigned Captain Edward Smith, who served as her captain for nine years. When the Boer War started in 1899, Smith and Majestic were called upon to transport troops to Cape Colony. Two trips were made to South Africa, one in December 1899 and one in February 1900, both without incident. Charles Lightoller served as a deck officer under Smith during this period.

In 1902–1903, the ship underwent a refit, which included updates to much of her passenger accommodations, new boilers and taller twin funnels, after which she returned to the Liverpool-New York run. Smith left as captain in 1904 to take command of the new Baltic, then the largest ship in the world. In 1905, Majestic suffered a fire in her bunker, but the damage was not significant. In 1907, White Star inaugurated a new express service from Southampton to New York via Cherbourg and Queenstown, to which Majestic, along with Teutonic, Oceanic and the newly completed Adriatic were transferred. Majestic departed Southampton for the first time on 26 June.

When  entered service in 1911, Teutonic was removed from the New York run and transferred to the Dominion Line for Canadian service. When  entered service in April 1912, Majestic was retired from White Star's New York service and designated as a reserve ship, biding her time at Birkenhead's Bidston Dock. Titanic was lost on her maiden voyage, and Majestic was returned to service in her former role.

On 17 October 1913, she came to the rescue of the French schooner Garonne, which had wrecked. On 14 January 1914, Majestic departed on her last Atlantic crossing. By this point she had been in service for nearly 24 years, during which time she had carried a total of 163,363 passengers westbound, and another 113,524 passengers eastbound. Soon after, she was sold for scrap to the Thos. W. Ward yard at Morecambe. Before scrapping of the ship commenced, the scrapping company opened the ship for public tours, and some of the interior panelling was saved and used in the offices of the Ward company.

See also

References

Historic information on the Majestic
Majestic I on Titanic-Titanic.com

External links

White Star Line on Titanic-Titanic.com
Majestic at the WSL History site

Blue Riband holders
Ships of the White Star Line
1889 ships
Ships built by Harland and Wolff
Ships built in Belfast
Steamships of the United Kingdom
Ocean liners of the United Kingdom